House of Wax may refer to:

a wax museum
House of Wax (1953 film), a 1953 3D horror film starring Vincent Price
House of Wax (2005 film), a 2005 horror film starring Elisha Cuthbert and Chad Michael Murray
House of Wax (EP), an EP by Insane Clown Posse
"House of Wax", a song on the 2007 album Memory Almost Full by Paul McCartney

See also 
Dr Phibes & the House of Wax Equations, a British rock band
 Mystery of the Wax Museum (1933), remade in 1953 as House of Wax